In enzymology, an alternansucrase is an enzyme that catalyzes a chemical reaction that transfers an alpha-D-glucosyl residue from sucrose alternately to the 6- and 3-positions of the non-reducing terminal residue of an alpha-D-glucan, thereby creating a glucan with alternating alpha-1,6- and alpha-1,3-bonds.  The name "alternan" was coined in 1982 (Cote & Robyt) for the glucan based on its alternating linkage structure.

This enzyme belongs to the family of glycosyltransferases, specifically the hexosyltransferases.  The systematic name of this enzyme class is sucrose:1,6(1,3)-alpha-D-glucan 6(3)-alpha-D-glucosyltransferase. Other names in common use include sucrose-1,6(3)-alpha-glucan 6(3)-alpha-glucosyltransferase, sucrose:1,6-, 1,3-alpha-D-glucan 3-alpha- and, and 6-alpha-D-glucosyltransferase.

References

 

EC 2.4.1
Enzymes of unknown structure